The 2004 North Indian Ocean cyclone season was the first in which tropical cyclones were officially named in the basin. Cyclone Onil, which struck India and Pakistan, was named in late September. The final storm, Cyclone Agni, was also named, and crossed into the southern hemisphere shortly before dissipation. This storm became notable during its origins and became one of the storms closest to the equator. The season was fairly active, with ten depressions forming from May to November. The India Meteorological Department designated four of these as cyclonic storms, which have maximum sustained winds of at least  averaged over three minutes. The Joint Typhoon Warning Center also issued warnings for five of the storms on an unofficial basis.

In early May, two tropical storms formed on opposite sides of India. The first formed on May 5 and meandered while intensifying, dropping  in Aminidivi in the Lakshadweep group offshore western India, which was the highest daily rainfall total in the basin. A week later, a cyclone – the strongest of the season – struck Myanmar, killing 236 people and leaving 25,000 people homeless. Depressions also formed on opposite sides of India in June. A depression in September killed 59 people after dropping torrential rainfall over Bangladesh and adjacent West Bengal. In October, another depression struck the region, killing 273 people. There was also a short-lived cyclonic storm in the Arabian Sea in November.


Season summary 

The India Meteorological Department (IMD) was designated a Regional Specialized Meteorological Center by the World Meteorological Organization in July 1988 to monitor and warn on tropical cyclones in the northern Indian Ocean. The basin is defined between 45° and 100° E, and north of the equator. The agency also used geostationary satellites and a network of buoys to track the storms, and utilized various tropical cyclone forecast models to predict future tracks. The American-based Joint Typhoon Warning Center (JTWC) also issued warnings for storms in the basin on an unofficial basis.

The monsoon became active in May as water temperatures became warm. Twin depressions formed during June on opposite sides of India, which helped intensify the monsoon over the country. A notable feature of the season was the Arabian Sea being more active than the Bay of Bengal. The IMD began naming tropical cyclones within the basin in 2004, beginning after the monsoon season. As such, only two cyclonic storms in the latter half of the year were named.

Systems

Severe Cyclonic Storm ARB 01 

Toward the end of April, an area of convection persisted in the southern Bay of Bengal. It developed into a distinct low-pressure area on May 1 over the body of water, but soon moved westward into India without developing. On May 4, the system emerged from Kerala into the Arabian Sea, and soon after convection rapidly increased. Early on May 5, the JTWC classified the system as Tropical Cyclone 01A about 370 km (230 mi) west-southwest of Kochi, India. On the same day, the IMD began classifying it as a depression, but soon after upgraded it to a deep depression and later cyclonic storm after increased organization. The storm meandered off southwest India for three days due to weak steering currents. Increased wind shear, cooler waters, and dry air rapidly weakened the convection, exposing the center and causing the storm to deteriorate quickly into a depression. On May 10, the system degenerated into a remnant low off Gujarat, without any discernible low-level circulation.

The precursor to the storm brought heavy rainfall to southern India, reaching  in Thiruvananthapuram over 48 hours. While an active tropical cyclone, the storm dropped torrential rainfall to the Lakshadweep group offshore western India. Aminidivi recorded  over three days, including  in just 24 hours. This broke the record for the highest daily rainfall total related to a North Indian Ocean cyclone. The high rains cut communications from the island group to the mainland, and damaged 45 houses in conjunction with the winds. High waves sank 15 boats and one cargo ship while also causing erosion in Kerala. The storm killed nine people and caused ₹300 million rupees ($6.7 million USD).

Extremely Severe Cyclonic Storm BOB 01 

The second storm of the season formed as a depression on May 16 in the central Bay of Bengal. With low wind shear and a surge in the monsoon trough, the storm intensified while meandering over open waters. The storm eventually began a steady northeastward motion due to a ridge to the north over India. While approaching land, an eye developed in the center of the storm, indicative of a strong cyclone. The storm rapidly weakened over land, although its remnants spread rainfall into northern Thailand and Yunnan province in China.

Winds from the cyclone reached 157 km/h (98 mph) in Myanmar, occurring in conjunction with heavy rainfall and a high storm surge. Despite the storm's ferocity, the government did not report about the cyclone for ten days, as they usually under report on landfalling storms. The cyclone caused heavy damage throughout Rakhine State, destroying or heavily damaging 4,035 homes and leaving 25,000 people homeless. There was widespread crop damage, resulting in food shortages, and damaged roads disrupted subsequent relief efforts. Damage in Myanmar totaled over K621 million kyat (US$99.2 million), making it the worst storm in the country since 1968, and there were 236 deaths. Although damage was heaviest in Myanmar, the cyclone's effects also spread into neighboring Bangladesh, where strong winds knocked over trees and capsized two ships.

Deep Depression ARB 02 

On June 8, a low-pressure area formed in the eastern Arabian Sea. While remaining nearly stationary, the depression quickly intensified into a deep depression. The system later began a slow westward movement, due to a ridge to the north. On June 11, and again on the following day, the JTWC issued a Tropical Cyclone Formation Alert (TCFA), although the system never strengthened beyond its initial stages. Strong wind shear caused the depression to weaken, and the IMD downgraded it to a remnant low on June 13.

Deep Depression BOB 02 

A surge in the monsoon developed an area of convection over the Andaman Sea in early June, spawning a low-pressure area, which later became a depression on June 11. Moving to the northwest along a ridge, it strengthened into a deep depression the next day. Early on June 13, the system struck Odisha near Puri, and initially maintained its intensity over land. However, it eventually weakened, degenerating into a remnant low over Chhattisgarh on June 14. The depression dropped heavy rainfall in eastern India, particularly Odisha. There were no reports of damage.

Land Depression 01 

For about ten days in September, a monsoon depression persisted around the northern edge of the Bay of Bengal onto adjacent landmasses, initially associated with an upper-level low. On September 10, a low-pressure area developed within the monsoon trough in the extreme northern Bay of Bengal. Moving northwestward, it organized into a depression after it moved ashore, organizing over West Bengal near Kolkata. The system attained peak winds of  despite being over land. Located within a col, or weakness between ridges, the depression meandered over eastern India, weakening into a remnant low on September 15. It moved slowly northwestward, reaching Uttar Pradesh by September 22.

The depression dropped heavy rainfall in eastern India, including as a tropical cyclone, a precursor, and its remnant. Flash flooding in the Indian state of Tripura killed four people and isolated about 55,000 people. Three people died in West Bengal, where floodwaters left about 650,000 people homeless in hundreds of villages. Flash flooding in Uttar Pradesh killed 33 people overnight on September 21. In nearby Bangladesh, the depression produced additional flooding after a similar disaster occurred in July, temporarily isolating about 1 million people, and killing 19.

Severe Cyclonic Storm Onil 

A depression formed out of an area of convection southwest of India on September 30. The next day, it intensified into Cyclonic Storm Onil. becoming the first tropical cyclone on record to be named in the northern Indian Ocean. However, dry air quickly entered the system, causing it to rapidly weaken to a depression just off the coast of Gujarat, India. Over the following several days, the system took a slow, erratic track towards the south-southeast. After turning northeastward, the system made landfall near Porbandar on October 10 and dissipated shortly thereafter.

Throughout southeastern Pakistan and northwestern India, thousands of residents were evacuated prior to the cyclone's arrival. These rains led to flash flooding in several areas. Nine people died in several incidents related to the storm in Karachi. The drainage system of Hyderabad sustained significant damage, leading to several protests and demonstrations by city residents. Offshore, 300 fishermen are believed to have gone missing during the storm.

Depression BOB 03/04 

A low-pressure area formed in the Bay of Bengal on September 30 and gradually became more organized. It moved northwestward and developed into a depression on October 2. It rapidly weakened into a remnant low and turned to the northeast. On October 7, the system re-intensified into a depression near Bankura despite being over land, aided by moisture from the Bay of Bengal. After crossing into northern Bangladesh, the system again weakened into a remnant low, which gradually elongated and weakened.

For several days in early October, the depression dropped rainfall across southeastern India, which was heaviest after it re-intensified over land. Alipurduar in northeastern West Bengal recorded  in a 24-hour period, and Malda reported  in two days. In northern Andhra Pradesh, flooding from the depression affected 40 villages, wrecking 50 houses. The waters also inundated  of rice paddies and damaged 200 irrigation water tanks. In West Bengal, the floods killed 3,000 migratory birds and damaged ₹1.1 billion rupees (US$23.9 million) worth of crops; 51 people also died in the state. In neighboring Odisha, four people were killed, and the floods washed away a bridge and affected several villages.

The third large flood event of the year, the depression caused its most severe impact in northeastern India, where 218 people were killed, including 112 in the city of Goalpara alone. There, the floods struck in the middle of the night, catching residents off guard and washing away hundreds of houses along two whole blocks. Flash flooding caused landslides in Kamrup, while regional and national roads were damaged or submerged. Over 15,000 people were forced to evacuate their homes to emergency shelters. Across the region,  of crops were damaged, and 30,000 homes were damaged or destroyed. Rainfall spread into Nepal, where  was recorded at the airport in Kathmandu. The precipitation led to a snowstorm in Tibet, reaching  in one location; this marked the highest daily snowfall for the station in October, and caused a loss of crops and livestock.

Deep Depression ARB 04 

An area of convection formed west of Sri Lanka on October 31, organizing around a circulation center. Low wind shear allowed slow development, and a low-pressure area developed on November 1 in the southeastern Arabian Sea. The following day, a depression formed off the southwest coast of India. Moving northward, the system's convection continued to organize around the center, and the JTWC classified it as Tropical Cyclone 04A on November 4. The IMD upgraded it to a deep depression on the next day as the storm began moving westward. Drier air from the north caused the thunderstorms to weaken and expose the circulation. The IMD downgraded the system to a remnant low on November 7, and the remnants continued to the west-southwest, passing near Socotra Island. On November 9, the remnant circulation brushed the coast of Somalia after redeveloping some convection, but there was no redevelopment.

Severe Cyclonic Storm Agni 

A tropical disturbance was observed on November 19 about 800 km (500 mi) southeast of Colombo, Sri Lanka in the Bay of Bengal. The disturbance tracked westward, weakening after passing south of Sri Lanka. It entered the Arabian Sea on November 26, and despite being located unusually close to the equator, the system maintained convection about its circulation, aided by low wind shear. While the system was organizing, the center crossed the equator to reach about 0.5° S, thus becoming an anticyclonic circulation in the southern hemisphere. This was unusual, as the Coriolis effect is nonexistent along the equator—the Coriolis effect refers to planetary vorticity, which provides the spin in a cyclone. On November 28, the JTWC classified it as Tropical Cyclone 05A just 78 km (48 mi) from the equator. The IMD classified it as a depression the next day at 1.5° N, noting that "cyclogenesis ... at such low latitudes has not occurred in the past." It rivaled Tropical Storm Vamei as one of the closest storms to the equator.

After developing, the system moved northwestward due to a ridge over India. The IMD upgraded the depression to Cyclonic Storm Agni late on November 29 and further to a severe cyclonic storm the next day. The JTWC also upgraded Agni to the equivalent of a minimal hurricane, estimating . Wind shear and dry air caused the storm to weaken. After Agni turned westward, the IMD downgraded it to a depression and later remnant low on December 2, although the JTWC tracked it for another day, issuing their final advisory while Agni was about 450 km (275 mi) south-southeast of Cape Guardafui—the easternmost point of the Horn of Africa. The remnants moved ashore at eastern Somalia, before turning to the south and dissipating on December 5.

Season effects 

|-
| Severe Cyclonic Storm ARB 01 (2004)|ARB 01||  || bgcolor=#| || bgcolor=#| || bgcolor=#| || Kerala, Karnataka, Goa ||$6.7 million || 9 ||
|-
| BOB 01 ||  || bgcolor=#| || bgcolor=#| || bgcolor=#|||Myanmar, East India, Bangladesh || $99.2 million ||  236 ||
|-
| ARB 02 || || bgcolor=#| || bgcolor=#| || bgcolor=#| ||West India || None ||  Unknown ||
|-
| BOB 02 || || bgcolor=#| || bgcolor=#| || bgcolor=#| ||East India ||  Unknown ||  Unknown ||
|-
| LAND || || bgcolor=#| || bgcolor=#| || bgcolor=#| || East India || Unknown || 59||
|-
| Onil || || bgcolor=#| || bgcolor=#| || bgcolor=#| || West India, Pakistan || Unknown ||9 ||
|-
| BOB 03/04 || || bgcolor=#| || bgcolor=#| || bgcolor=#||| East India || $23.9 million || 273 ||
|-
| ARB 04 || || bgcolor=#| || bgcolor=#| || bgcolor=#|  || Somalia || Unknown || None ||
|-
| Agni ||  || bgcolor=#| || bgcolor=#|  || bgcolor=#|  || Somalia, Maldives || Unknown || Unknown ||
|-

See also 

 North Indian Ocean tropical cyclone
 Tropical cyclones in 2004
 List of wettest tropical cyclones
 List of wettest known tropical cyclones in Pakistan
 2004 Atlantic hurricane season
 2004 Pacific hurricane season
 2004 Pacific typhoon season
 South-West Indian Ocean cyclone seasons: 2003–04, 2004–05
 Australian region cyclone seasons: 2003–04, 2004–05
 South Pacific cyclone seasons: 2003–04, 2004–05

References

External links 
 Gary Padgett Tropical Cyclone Summary
 Gary Padgett Tropical Cyclone Summary Part 2
 Tropical Cyclone Operational Plan for the Bay of Bengal and the Arabian Sea
 Impact of Cyclonic Storms and Suggested Mitigation Actions (by India Meteorological Department)
 WMO/ESCAP Panel on Tropical Cyclones Final Report

 
2004 NIO